An AV drive (audio-visual drive) is a hard disk drive that is designed specifically for audio and video purposes. They were used in the late 1990s for sustained media transfers; they delayed thermal recalibration so it would not interfere with the transfer.

AV drives were also popular in the early ages of CD burning; early CD writers ruined the disk when a buffer underrun occurred, which could happen during the hard drive's automatic calibration.

They are now obsolete, as normal hard drives are designed to handle realtime media through servo calibration to monitor head alignment and through the use of larger memory buffers.

Hard disk drives